Elena Kuchinskaya-Andreeva (born 11 December 1984) is a Russian former racing cyclist. She participated between 2005 and 2014 at the UCI Road World Championships. In 2007 Kuchinskaya was suspended for two years after she failed a drug test for furosemide doping.

Major results

2007
 National Road Championships
3rd Road race
3rd Time trial
 9th Sparkassen Giro
2010
 5th Overall Thüringen Rundfahrt der Frauen
2013
 4th Overall Tour of Zhoushan Island
 5th Overall Tour de Bretagne Féminin
 6th Overall Tour of Adygeya
1st Mountains classification
2014
 5th Overall Tour of Zhoushan Island
 5th Grand Prix GSB
 7th Overall Vuelta Internacional Femenina a Costa Rica
 7th Grand Prix de Oriente
 10th Grand Prix el Salvador
2015
 2nd Overall Tour of Zhoushan Island
 4th Overall Tour of Adygeya
 5th Grand Prix of Maykop
2016
 1st Overall Tour of Zhoushan Island
1st Mountains classification
1st Stage 2

References

External links

1984 births
Living people
Russian female cyclists
Sportspeople from Taganrog
Doping cases in cycling
Cyclists at the 2015 European Games
European Games competitors for Russia
21st-century Russian women